Corallofungus is a genus of fungi in the Hydnaceae family. The genus is monotypic, containing the single species Corallofungus hatakeyamanus, found in Japan.

References

External links
 

Cantharellales
Fungi of Asia
Fungi described in 1983
Monotypic Basidiomycota genera